Language in Society is a peer-reviewed academic journal of sociolinguistics. It was established in 1972 and is published five times a year by Cambridge University Press. The current editors in chief are Susan Ehrlich (York University) and Tommaso Milani (University of Gothenburg). It has a circulation of 1900.

According to the Journal Citation Reports, the journal's 2020 impact factor is 2.38, ranking it 33rd out of 193 journals in the category "Linguistics," and 58th out of 149 journals in the category "Sociology."

Aims and scope
The journal treats language and communication in the context of social life. Apart from sociolinguistics, its scope encompasses also related fields, such as linguistic anthropology. Taking an international perspective, the journal aims at encouraging discussion among researchers and disciplines.

References

English-language journals
Sociolinguistics journals
Cambridge University Press academic journals
Publications established in 1972
5 times per year journals